Veronika Kudermetova and Elise Mertens defeated Lyudmyla Kichenok and Jeļena Ostapenko in the final, 6–1, 6–3 to win the women's doubles tennis title at the 2022 Dubai Tennis Championships. Ostapenko was aiming to become the first woman to win both the singles and doubles titles in the same edition of the Dubai Tennis Championships.

Alexa Guarachi and Darija Jurak Schreiber were the defending champions, but lost in the first round to Coco Gauff and Jessica Pegula.

Seeds

Draw

Draw

References

External links
Main draw

2022 WTA Tour
Doubles women